Philip Rudolph Besler (December 9, 1913 — February 13, 1995) was a Canadian hockey player who played 30 games in the National Hockey League with the Boston Bruins, Chicago Black Hawks, and Detroit Red Wings between 1935 and 1939. The rest of his career, which lasted from 1934 to 1942, was spent in different minor leagues. Besler was born in Melville, Saskatchewan.

Career statistics

Regular season and playoffs

External links
 

1913 births
1995 deaths
Boston Bruins players
Boston Cubs players
Canadian ice hockey right wingers
Cleveland Barons (1937–1973) players
Chicago Blackhawks players
Detroit Red Wings players
Ice hockey people from Saskatchewan
Omaha Knights (AHA) players
Pittsburgh Hornets players
Place of death missing
Portland Buckaroos players
Providence Reds players
Sportspeople from Melville, Saskatchewan